Mary Connor Neely (born April 10, 1991) is an American actress, writer, director, and editor. She rose to prominence during the 2020 coronavirus pandemic with a series of self-filmed lip-sync videos reenacting scenes from well-known musicals. She published her videos on Twitter (see below) to broad acclaim. Neely also appeared in the 2020 remake of Valley Girl and directed the 2017 short film Pink Trailer, which premiered at the South by Southwest Film Festival.

Early life 
Mary Connor Neely was born on April 10, 1991, in Los Angeles, California, to Mark Neely, an actor, and Mary Neely (née Johnson), a commercial producer. Her parents divorced when she was young and she was raised equally between them. Neely is an only child. Her paternal grandmother is a survivor of the Holocaust.

Growing up in Los Angeles, Neely has described it as both “really interesting” and “odd”.

 
Though both of her parents exited entertainment when Neely was in elementary school, a lot of their friends were “crew people” which led Neely to grow up in the industry but as she described, “it wasn’t glamorous.”
 
Neely lived in 13 different houses by the time she was 18 years old in the Glendale, Altadena, Pasadena, South Pasadena, Santa Monica, and West LA neighborhoods of Los Angeles. She cites the exposure to so many different kinds of people and places as a catalyst for her interest in performing.
 
Neely started acting in community theater productions at age eight, saying her love for musicals was akin to a religion. 
 
During summers in high school, Neely attended drama programs at UCLA and Carnegie Mellon. Neely graduated from The Archer School for Girls in 2009  before studying acting at UCLA’s School of Theater Film and Television on scholarship.

Career 
During her junior year at UCLA, Neely was scouted by a commercial casting director at a barbecue and began auditioning while still enrolled in school. She graduated from UCLA in 2013 with a major in Theater and a minor in Scandinavian culture. Upon completing her degree, the faculty of the theater school awarded her the Judith and Milton R. Stark scholarship, given based on artistic merit.
 
Neely has been cast in over twenty national commercials, most notably as goth daughter Debbie in Pepcid’s The Burns Family campaign alongside Richard Riehle and as the bubbly Tide Pods Waitress, which ran in the U.S. and Canada from 2015-2019.
 
Frustrated by the lack of nuance written into female TV and film roles, Neely began creating her own projects, learning how to edit using YouTube tutorials. Neely’s first short film, The Dresser, was nominated for the Golden Egg award at the Reykjavík International Film Festival. A comedy about Sofia, a young actress grappling with her control issues by trying and failing to hook up with a co-star, Neely wrote, directed, edited, produced, and starred. 
 
She then made Wacko Smacko, an eight-episode web series based on The Dresser that follows Sofia as she fumbles through ordeals with dating, friendships, and family while trying to develop an acting career in Los Angeles. Neely again wrote, directed, produced, and starred. The series was licensed to the YouTube channel Snarled and was well-received, with over 500,000 views. One critic said of Wacko Smacko, “Neely’s storytelling is raw and real, and her character Sofia is, thankfully, imperfect and nuanced, a person with aspirations who also occasionally shoots herself in the foot, and is by no means a one-dimensional female stereotype.”
 
In 2017 Neely was hired to direct and edit Pink Trailer, a short film that follows two young women, Julie and Lucy, as they housesit for Lucy’s grandmother  but keep getting visited by a foreboding neighbor. Neely blended comedy with hints of horror to accentuate serious discussions about mental health and growing up. The film premiered at the South by Southwest film festival and opened Palm Springs ShortFest to positive reviews, Refinery29 comparing it to Greta Gerwig’s Lady Bird. In 2019 Pink Trailer played as a pre-feature short before Olivia Wilde’s Booksmart at the Oriental Theater in Milwaukee.
 
In 2018 Neely directed and edited her first music video, Margaret, for LA band Pinky Pinky. Deemed a “masterpiece” by Paper Magazine, the video stars Teresa Ganzel as a lonely, pill-popping, Chardonnay-drinking mother of a teenage girl. Neely described it as a “dark version” of the 2003 Fountains of Wayne music video for Stacy's Mom.
 
In 2020 Neely appeared in MGM’s remake of Valley Girl, was chosen as one of Adweek’s Creative 100 and named a New Face at the Just for Laughs Comedy Festival in Montreal.

Coronavirus Lockdown Project 
During the initial lockdown of the coronavirus pandemic in March 2020, Neely, isolated and living alone, decided to record herself on an iPhone, reenacting love duets from classic musicals like Les Misérables, Phantom of the Opera, Grease, Hamilton, among others. Doing so involved her lip-syncing both male and female parts on-camera, wearing a variety of wigs and costumes as well as editing each video.
 

 
Her efforts resulted in media attention, performance offers, and widespread praise, including compliments from broadcast TV showrunners Krista Vernoff, Warren Leight and Mike Schur plus Broadway luminaries Lin-Manuel Miranda and Andrew Lloyd Webber.
 
The last in Neely’s video series was Belle, the opening number from Disney’s Beauty and the Beast. Neely plays over 40 characters and choreographed the number in and around her apartment building . The finale gained one million views on Twitter in six days, Nerdist writing, “The song begins, and so does the beautiful chaos that is her-self proclaimed 'magnum opus.' It’s magic”.
 
After wrapping up the initial thread of love song covers in April, Neely came back in May with a full song-by-song reenactment of The Sound of Music to raise money for Broadway Cares/Equity Fights AIDS. After meeting her $7,000 fundraising goal in one hour, Neely managed to raise $25,000 for theater performers seeking COVID relief.
 
The New York Times and The Washington Post included Neely’s quarantine created videos in their Best Theater of 2020 roundups, the former claiming, “For a few heroic weeks, she was a one-woman incarnation of musical theater itself”.

Filmography

Film

Television

Web

Music Videos

Awards and nominations

References

External links

Living people
21st-century American actresses
Actresses from California
People from Los Angeles
1991 births